Isabel Clark may refer to:

 Isabel Clark Ribeiro (born 1976), snowboarder from Brazil
 Isabel Clark (nurse) (1885–1915), New Zealand nurse